Robert Philip Goldman (born 1942) is the William and Catherine Magistretti Distinguished Professor of Sanskrit at the Department of South and Southeast Asian Studies at the University of California, Berkeley. He is also the winner of the Sanskrit Award for 2017 by the Indian Council on Cultural Relations (ICCR) as well as a Fellow of the American Academy of Arts and Sciences since April 1996.

Biography

Early life and education 
Goldman was born in 1942. He went to Columbia College and obtained an A.B. degree in 1964. He also received a Ph.D. from the University of Pennsylvania in 1971.

Career 
Goldman is notable for his English translation of the Rāmāyaṇa published by Princeton University Press in 7 volumes between 1990 and 2019. His co-translators on the work included Sheldon I. Pollock, Rosalind Lefeber, Barend A. van Nooten, and Sally J. Sutherland Goldman.

References

Further reading 
Clay, John P. Ramáyana Synopsis. Clay Sanskrit Library. Retrieved 15 October 2017. 
Goldman, Robert P., ed. (1985). The Rāmāyaṇa of Vālmīki: An Epic of Ancient India, Volume I: Balakāṇḍa. Princeton University Press. Retrieved 15 October 2017.
Rediff.com (1 June 2007). At US university, Sanskrit comes of age.  Retrieved 15 October 2017.
Sutherland, Sally J. and Goldman, Robert P. Devavanipravesika: An Introduction to the Sanskrit Language. Vedanta Society of Southern California. Retrieved 15 October 2017.

External links 
Faculty Profile
Faculty profile

YouTube videos by UC Berkeley
Robert Goldman sings from the Ramayana Published on 17 Nov 2016
Famous Ramayana epic now in modern English Published on 17 Nov 2016

American Indologists
American Sanskrit scholars
Sanskrit–English translators
Translators of the Ramayana
University of California, Berkeley College of Letters and Science faculty
Columbia College (New York) alumni
University of Pennsylvania alumni
Living people
1942 births